The 16th International Gold Cup was a non-championship Formula One race held at Oulton Park on August 16, 1969. The race was open to Formula One, Formula Two and Formula 5000 cars. Brabham driver Jacky Ickx was first in Formula One and first overall, ahead of Jochen Rindt giving the four wheel drive Lotus 63 its best ever result. Andrea de Adamich's Lola T142 was top Formula 5000 finisher and third overall, and Alan Rollinson in a Brabham was top Formula Two finisher and sixth overall. Jackie Stewart qualified his Matra MS80 on pole and set fastest lap but a pit stop to remedy a broken battery lead dropped him down the field.

Classification
Blue background denotes F5000 entrants, red background denotes F2 entrants.

References

International Gold Cup
International Gold Cup